The Chavanga is a river in the south of the Kola Peninsula in Murmansk Oblast, Russia. The Chavanga originates from the Lake Nizhneye Ondomozero and flows into the White Sea in the village Chavanga.

References

Rivers of Murmansk Oblast
Drainage basins of the White Sea